Gulou station, is an interchange station on Line 1 and Line 4 of the Nanjing Metro. Opened on 3 September 2005 for the Line 1 portion of the station, Gulou station is among the first Nanjing Metro stations to open for passenger service. The line 4 section of the station opened on 18 January 2017, with cultural exhibits lining the station's walls.

References 

Railway stations in Jiangsu
Nanjing Metro stations
Railway stations in China opened in 2005